Irina Aleksandrovna Starykh (born 26 August 1987) is a Russian biathlete.

Career
She won the gold medal in the sprint competition at the 2013 European Championships. 

Starykh was seen as a medal hope for Russia at the 2014 Winter Olympics in Sochi but was withdrawn from the team after she failed a doping test.

She was disqualified for doping for three years since 23 December 2013.

Biathlon results
All results are sourced from the International Biathlon Union.

World Championships

*During Olympic seasons competitions are only held for those events not included in the Olympic program.
**The single mixed relay was added as an event in 2019.

References

External links 
 

1987 births
Russian female biathletes
Living people
Russian sportspeople in doping cases
Doping cases in biathlon
Universiade gold medalists for Russia
Universiade medalists in biathlon
Competitors at the 2009 Winter Universiade